Marampalli railway station (station code:MRPL), is an Indian Railways station near Marampalli, a village in West Godavari district of Andhra Pradesh. It lies on the Vijayawada–Chennai section and is administered under Vijayawada railway division of South Central Railway zone. 10 trains halt in this station every day. It is the 3690th-busiest station in the country.

History 
Between 1893 and 1896,  of the East Coast State Railway, between Vijayawada and MRPLttack was opened for traffic. The southern part of the West Coast State Railway (from Waltair to Vijayawada) was taken over by Madras Railway in 1901.

References

External links 

Railway stations in West Godavari district
Vijayawada railway division